The Girl's Guide to Depravity is a softcore comedy/drama series based on Heather Rutman's popular blog of the same name. The show debuted in the US on Cinemax in February 2012 and has aired internationally in Latin America (HBO), Spain (Cuatro), Canada (IFC), and Japan (Dentsu).

Premise
Based on a blog, The Girl's Guide to Depravity is about two women, Lizzie (Sally Golan) and Samantha (Rebecca Blumhagen) and the rules they use to have fun and avoid being hurt in relationships.

Cast and characters
 Rebecca Blumhagen - Samantha
 Sally Golan - Lizzie
 Tessa Harnetiaux - Megan (Season 2)
 Megan Barrick - Jenna (Season 2)
 Jesse Liebman - Jason
 Nick Clark - Dean
 Kirk Barker - Ben
 Joe Komara - Tyler
 Chasty Ballesteros - Rachel (Season 2)
 Jeff Takacs - Blair
 Margaret Keane Williams - Kate
 Topher Mikels - Dirty Hot Guy
 Kyle Knies - Drew
 Riley Steele - Kaylie
 Victoria Atkin - Camilla
 Christina Collard - Pill Pusher Penni

Episode list

Season 1 (2012)

Season 2 (2013)

References

External links
 

2010s American sex comedy television series
2012 American television series debuts
2013 American television series endings
2010s American sitcoms
Cinemax original programming
Television series by Warner Bros. Television Studios
Erotic television series
Works based on blogs
Television shows set in Chicago